Murid betaherpesvirus 1 (MuHV-1) is a species of virus in the genus Muromegalovirus, subfamily Betaherpesvirinae, family Herpesviridae, and order Herpesvirales.

References

External links
 

Betaherpesvirinae